Shuttarna III was a Mitanni king who reigned for a short period in the 14th century BC. He was the son of Artatama II, a usurper to the throne of Tushratta.

At that time, Assyria, led by Ashur-uballit I, became more powerful. But also Babylon, led by Burnaburiash II, was a rival. The events of this period are reflected in the Amarna correspondence.

Shuttarna sought support from the Assyrians, but was defeated when a Hittite army marched towards the capital and installed Shattiwaza on the throne.

See also

Mitanni

References

Hurrian kings
14th-century BC people